Sandra Gasparini (born 28 November 1990 in Sterzing) is an Italian luger who has competed since 2006. She won the silver medal in the mixed team event at the 2007 FIL World Luge Championships in Igls, Austria.

Gaparini also won a bronze in the mixed team relay event at the 2008 FIL European Luge Championships in Cesana, Italy.

She competed at the 2010 Winter Olympics where she finished 20th.

References
 FIL-Luge profile
 Hickok sports information on World champions in luge and skeleton.

External links
 

1990 births
Living people
Italian lugers
Italian female lugers
Olympic lugers of Italy
Lugers at the 2010 Winter Olympics
Lugers at the 2014 Winter Olympics
Sportspeople from Sterzing